Xu Qing (born 1969) is a Chinese actress.

Xu Qing may also refer to:

Xu Qing (engineer) (born 1960), Chinese ship designer
Xu Qing (swimmer) (born 1992), Chinese Paralympic swimmer
Xu Qing (character), fictional Song dynasty knight-errant

See also
Xu Qin, Chinese politician